Chlorissa cloraria, the southern grass emerald, is a species of moth in the  family Geometridae. It is found in most of Europe, except Ireland, Great Britain, the Netherlands, Denmark, Fennoscandia, Estonia and northern Russia.

The wingspan is 18–20 mm. Adults are on wing in May and June.

The larvae are polyphagous and feed on various trees, shrubs and low plants, including Corylus avellana and Crataegus species. Larvae can be found from June to September.

References

External links
Lepiforum.de

Moths described in 1813
Hemitheini
Moths of Europe
Taxa named by Jacob Hübner